Columbella is a genus of small sea snails, marine gastropod mollusks in the family Columbellidae, the dove snails.

Species
Species within the genus Columbella include:
 Columbella adansoni Menke, 1853
 Columbella aphthaegera R.P. Lesson, 1842 
 Columbella aureomexicana (Howard, 1963)
 Columbella castanea G.B. Sowerby, 1832
 Columbella costa Simone, 2007
 Columbella dysoni Reeve, 1859
 Columbella fuscata G.B. Sowerby, 1832
 Columbella haemastoma Sowerby, 1832
 Columbella labiosa Sowerby, 1822
 Columbella major Sowerby, 1832
 Columbella marrae Garcia E., 1999
 Columbella mercatoria (Linnaeus, 1758)
 Columbella paytensis Lesson, 1830
 Columbella rustica (Linnaeus, 1758)
 Columbella rusticoides Heilprin, 1886
 Columbella socorroensis Shasky, 1970
 Columbella sonsonatensis (Mörch, 1860)
 Columbella strombiformis Lamarck, 1822
 Columbella xiphitella Duclos, 1840
 Nomen dubium
 Columbella erythraeensis: 
 Columbella nomanensis:
Taxa inquirenda
 Columbella aricia P.L. Duclos, 1846 
 Columbella asopis P.L. Duclos, 1846 
 Columbella azima P.L. Duclos, 1846 
 Columbella cledonida P.L. Duclos, 1846
 Columbella helvia Duclos, 1846
 Columbella isabellina Crosse, 1865
 Columbella kirostra Duclos, 1840
 Columbella mariae Brazier, 1877
 Columbella menaletta Duclos, 1846
 Columbella michaui Crosse & P. Fischer, 1863
 Columbella ortigia Duclos, 1848
 Columbella prosymnia Duclos, 1850 (taxon inquirendum, a species of Chauvetia)
 Columbella strenella Duclos, 1840
 Columbella teophania Duclos, 1848 
 Columbella testina Duclos, 1840 
 Columbella ticaonis G. B. Sowerby I, 1844 (taxuse in recent literature currently undocumented)
 Columbella vitula Barnard, 1959

Species brought into synonymy
 Columbella alabastrum v. Martens, 1880;: synonym of Mitrella conspersa (Gaskoin, 1851)
 Columbella albina Kiener, 1840: synonym of Mitrella albina (Kiener, 1841)
 Columbella alphonsiana Hervier, 1900: synonym of Mitromorpha alphonsiana (Hervier, 1900)
 Columbella anakisia Duclos, 1850: synonym of Engina anakisia (Duclos, 1850)
 Columbella apicata Smith, 1899: synonym of Mitrella apicata (E. A. Smith, 1899)
 Columbella azora Duclos, 1846: synonym of Euplica festiva (Deshayes, 1834)
 Columbella catenata G.B. Sowerby I, 1844: synonym of Anachis catenata (G.B. Sowerby, 1844)
 Columbella circumstriata Schepman, 1911 : synonym of Mitrella circumstriata (Schepman, 1911)
 Columbella concinna G.B. Sowerby I, 1822: synonym of Rhombinella laevigata (Linnaeus, 1758)
 Columbella coniformis G.B. Sowerby I, 1844: synonym of Parametaria epamella (Duclos, 1840)
 Columbella conspersa: synonym of Mitrella conspersa (Gaskoin, 1851)
 Columbella coronata G.B. Sowerby I, 1832: synonym of Anachis coronata (G.B. Sowerby I, 1832)
 Columbella costellata G.B. Sowerby I, 1832: synonym of Anachis vexillum (Reeve, 1858)
 Columbella costellata Broderip & G.B. Sowerby I, 1829: synonym of Anachis costellata (Broderip & G.B. Sowerby I, 1829)
 Columbella decorata Gould, 1860 in 1859-61 : synonym of Anachis sertularium (d'Orbigny, 1841)
 Columbella decussata Sowerby I, 1844: synonym of Pyrene decussata (Sowerby I, 1844)
 Columbella dibolos Barnard, 1964: synonym of Anarithma stepheni (Melvill & Standen, 1897)
 Columbella dichroa G.B. Sowerby I, 1844: synonym of Mitrella dichroa (G.B. Sowerby I, 1844)
 Columbella dormitor G.B. Sowerby I, 1844: synonym of Mitromorpha dormitor (Sowerby I, 1844)
 Columbella duclosiana G.B. Sowerby I, 1844: synonym of Pseudanachis duclosiana (G.B. Sowerby I, 1844)
 Columbella elongata Schepman, 1911 : synonym of Mitrella longissima Monsecour & Monsecour, 2007
 Columbella exilis: synonym of Zafra exilis (Philippi, 1849)
 Columbella eximia: synonym of Mitrella eximia (Reeve, 1846)
 Columbella fabula G.B. Sowerby I, 1844: synonym of Pardalinops testudinaria (Link, 1807)
 Columbella fasciata G.B. Sowerby I, 1825: synonym of Anachis fasciata (G.B. Sowerby I, 1825)
 Columbella flava (Bruguière, 1789): synonym of Pyrene flava (Bruguière, 1789)
 Columbella floccata Reeve, 1859: synonym of Mitrella floccata (Reeve, 1859)
 Columbella fluctuata G.B. Sowerby I, 1832: synonym of Anachis fluctuata (G.B. Sowerby I, 1832)
 Columbella fulgurans Lamarck, 1822: synonym of Pictocolumbella ocellata (Link, 1807)
 Columbella galaxias: synonym of Mitrella nympha (Kiener, 1841)
 Columbella gervillei (Payraudeau 1826): synonym of Mitrella gervillii (Payraudeau, 1826)
 Columbella gowllandi Brazier, 1874: synonym of Zafra pumila (Dunker, 1858)
 Columbella guttata G.B. Sowerby I, 1832: synonym of Mitrella guttata (G.B. Sowerby I, 1832)
 Columbella harpiformis G.B. Sowerby I, 1832: synonym of Microcithara harpiformis (G.B. Sowerby I, 1832)
 Columbella impolita G.B. Sowerby I, 1844: synonym of Mitrella impolita (G.B. Sowerby I, 1844)
 Columbella jaspidea G.B. Sowerby I, 1844: synonym of Metanachis jaspidea (G.B. Sowerby I, 1844)
 Columbella kraussi G.B. Sowerby I, 1844: synonym of Anachis kraussi (G.B. Sowerby I, 1844)
 Columbella levania Duclos, 1848: synonym of [unassigned] Mitromorphidae levania (Duclos, 1848) (taxon inquerendum)
 Columbella ligula Duclos: synonym of Mitrella ligula (Duclos, 1835)
 Columbella linigera Duclos, 1846: synonym of [unassigned] Mitromorphidae linigera (Duclos, 1846) (taxon inquirendum)
 Columbella lysidia Duclos, 1850: synonym of Monilispira lysidia (Duclos, 1850)
 Columbella macandrewi G.B. Sowerby III, 1905: synonym of Mitrella macandrewi (G.B. Sowerby III, 1905)
 Columbella mendicaria: synonym of Engina mendicaria (Linnaeus, 1758)
 Columbella mindoroensis: synonym of Mitrella mindorensis (Reeve, 1859)
 Columbella moleculina Duclos, 1846: synonym of Mitrella moleculina (Duclos, 1840)
 Columbella moleculinella Dautzenberg, 1932 : synonym of Pyreneola shepstonensis (Smith, 1910)
 Columbella nympha: synonym of Mitrella nympha (Kiener, 1841)
 Columbella ostreicola G.B. Sowerby III, 1882: synonym of Anachis ostreicola (G.B. Sowerby III, 1882)
 Columbella pacei Melvill & Standen, 1896: synonym of Anarithma stepheni (Melvill & Standen, 1897)
 Columbella pardalina Lamarck, 1822: synonym of Pardalinops testudinaria (Link, 1807)
 Columbella philippinarum Reeve, 1842 : synonym of Parametaria epamella (Duclos, 1840)
 Columbella planaxiformis G.B. Sowerby III, 1894: synonym of Mitrella bicincta (Gould, 1860)
 Columbella plexa Hedley, 1902: synonym of Retizafra plexa (Hedley, 1902)
 Columbella plutonida Duclos, 1846: synonym of Columbellopsis nycteis (Duclos, 1846)
 Columbella profundi Dall, 1889: synonym of Astyris profundi (Dall, 1889)
 Columbella pumila Dunker, 1859: synonym of Zafra pumila (Dunker, 1858)
 Columbella pupa G.B. Sowerby III, 1894: synonym of Pyreneola pupa (G.B. Sowerby III, 1894)
 Columbella pusilla Pease, 1863: synonym of Mitrella nympha (Kiener, 1841)
 Columbella regulus Souverbie, 1863: synonym of Zafra pumila (Dunker, 1858)
 Columbella richardi (Dautzenberg & Fisher, 1906): synonym of Anachis richardi (Dautzenberg & H. Fischer, 1906)
 Columbella savingyi: synonym of Zafra savignyi (Moazzo, 1939)
 Columbella semipicta G.B. Sowerby III, 1894: synonym of Pyreneola semipicta (G.B. Sowerby III, 1894)
 Columbella simplex Schepman, 1911 : synonym of Mitrella simplex (Schepman, 1911)
 Columbella stepheni Melvill & Standen, 1897: synonym of Anarithma stepheni (Melvill & Standen, 1897)
 Columbella suavis Smith, 1906 : synonym of Astyris suavis (Smith, 1906)
 Columbella sublachryma Hervier, 1900: synonym of Anarithma sublachryma (Hervier, 1900)
 Columbella terpsichore: synonym of Anachis terpsichore (G.B. Sowerby II, 1822)
 Columbella testudinaria: synonym of Pardalinops testudinaria (Link, 1807)
 Columbella tringa: synonym of Nitidella nitida (Lamarck, 1822)
 Columbella troglodytes Souverbie, 1866: synonym of Zafra troglodytes (Souverbie in Souverbie & Montrouzier, 1866)
 Columbella turturina Lamarck, 1822: synonym of Euplica turturina (Lamarck, 1822)
 Columbella varians Sowerby, 1832: synonym of Euplica varians (G.B. Sowerby, 1832)
 Columbella versicolor Sowerby, 1832: synonym of Euplica scripta (Lamarck, 1822)
 Columbella zebra (Wood, 1828): synonym of Anachis miser (G. B. Sowerby I, 1844)
 Columbella zonata Gould, 1860: synonym of Zafra mitriformis A. Adams, 1860

According to the Indo-Pacific Molluscan Database, the following species names are also in current use, or have become synonyms :
 Columbella perplexa Schepman, 1911
 Columbella supraplicata Smith, 1899

References

 Duclos P.L. -1850, 1846 Columbella. In J.C. Chenu, Illustrations conchyliologiques ou description et figures de toutes les coquilles connues vivantes et fossiles, classées suivant le système de Lamarck modifié d'après les progrès de la science et comprenant les genres nouveaux et les espèces récemment découvertes, p. pls 13-17

External links
 
 Russini V., Fassio G., Modica M. V., deMaintenon M. J. & Oliverio M. 2017. An assessment of the genus Columbella Lamarck, 1799 (Gastropoda: Columbellidae) from eastern Atlantic. Zoosystema 39 (2): 197-212

Columbellidae
Gastropod genera
Taxa named by Jean-Baptiste Lamarck